Crusader Kings may refer to:

 The leaders of the Crusades (most notably the Third Crusade), against Islam and other religions
 Crusader Kings (video game), a computer game released by Paradox Interactive in 2004, and its sequels:
 Crusader Kings II
 Crusader Kings III